is a private railway company, which operates two lines in Ibaraki Prefecture in Japan. The company is a subsidiary of Keisei Electric Railway and other companies.
Additionally, the company has a bus department in Ibaraki Prefecture and Chiba Prefecture in Japan.

Overview 
This company was established as Joso Railway in 1913. In 1945, Joso Railway was merged into Joso-Tsukuba Railway with Tsukuba Railway. Joso-Tsukuba Railway was split into Kanto Railway in 1965, which merged with Ryugasaki Railway. Around 1980, Tsukuba Railway (which would be suspended) and Kashima Railway (which would be replaced by the Keisei affiliated company Kashitetsu Bus) were split from Kanto Railway. Mount Tsukuba Cable Car and Mount Tsukuba Ropeway were transferred to Keisei Electric Railway.
Kanto Railway has had a 0.01% investment in Metropolitan Intercity Railway Company since 2001.

Trains
The company operates the following two lines:
 Jōsō Line
 Ryūgasaki Line

Buses
The company manages the following four bus companies:

 Kanto Railway
 Kantetsu Green Bus
 Kantetsu Purple Bus
 Kantetsu Kankō Bus

Outline
Kanto Railway is also a bus company with coverage in the south and central Ibaraki and east Chiba. The bus department occupies 70% of benefit of the Kanto Railway. The company has ten offices and the service distance is 2,788.8 km.

The bus department used to have vast bus routes, but some were discontinued after proving unprofitable. Currently, certain discontinued bus routes have been revived as community buses operated by subsidiary bus companies (Kantetsu Green Bus, Kantetsu Purple Bus and Kantetsu Kankō Bus) in areas of Sakuragawa, Chikusei and more places.

The company has coverage of many attractions (Mount Tsukuba, Lake Kasumigaura, Kairakuen and so on), commercial facilities (Ami Premium Outlet, AeonMall Tsukuba and more), and a bed suburb of Tokyo (Tsukuba).

When many events are happening in Ibaraki, the company operates extra bus routes to Ibaraki Airport, Kashima Soccer Stadium and more.

Tickets can be purchased in stores at Mito Station (Ibaraki), Tsuchiura Station, Toride Station, Moriya Station, Tsukuba Station, Suigō-Itako Bus Terminal and more. Furthermore, there are ticket machines at the University of Tsukuba and Tsukuba Center.

Bus routes

Highway buses
TSUKUBA
Tokyo Station or Haneda Airport - Tsukuba Center
TM Liner
Tsukuba Center - Mito Station (Ibaraki)
MITO
Tokyo Station - Mito Station (Ibaraki)
KASHIMA
Tokyo Station or Haneda Airport - Tokyo Disney Resort - Suigō-Itako Bus Terminal - Kashima-Jingu Station
Night bus
Mito Station (Ibaraki), Tsuchiura Station and Tsukuba Station - Kyoto Station and Namba Station

Rolling stock

See also
Keisei Bus
Keisei Transit Bus
Tokyo Bay City Bus
Tokyo BRT

References

External links
Official website

Kantō Railway
Bus companies of Japan
Transport in Ibaraki Prefecture
Transport in Chiba Prefecture
Japanese companies established in 1922